was a Japanese video game developer and publisher founded in November 2005 and headquartered in Chiyoda, Tokyo. They released a number of games beginning with Ayakashibito in August 2006, and would go on to develop and release others for the PlayStation 2, PlayStation Portable, and Nintendo DS. The company worked with other developers such as HuneX, Microvision, and Vanillaware before closing its doors in August 2010.

Company history
Dimple was founded on November 17, 2005 with President Takeshi Kamio serving as head of operations. According to the company's official website, their name came from their desire to "offer entertainment to make unexpected smiles." Their main clients included other video game developers such as Sega, Sony Computer Entertainment, and Nintendo, as well as the Toppan Printing Company. In July 2010, Kamio announced that the company would be closing their doors the following month, with its final day of operation being August 31 of that year.

Games developed

Games published

References

External links
Dimple Entertainment at Giant Bomb

Video game publishers
Japanese companies established in 2005
Video game companies established in 2005
Video game companies disestablished in 2010
Defunct video game companies of Japan
Video game development companies
Software companies based in Tokyo
2010 disestablishments in Japan